Lios Póil (anglicized as Lispole) is a Gaeltacht village in County Kerry, Ireland. It is on the Dingle Peninsula, 8 km east of the town of Dingle and 40 km west of Tralee on the N86 National Secondary Route.

Transport
Bus Éireann services between Tralee and Dingle on the 275 route serve Lispole.

The Tralee and Dingle narrow gauge railway ran through Lispole, and a viaduct on the line still stands near the village. Lispole railway station opened on 1 April 1891, shut for passenger traffic on 17 April 1939, shut for goods traffic on 10 March 1947 and shut altogether on 1 July 1953.

People
Lispole is the birthplace of Joe Higgins, former Socialist Party TD for Dublin West and former MEP for the Dublin constituency.
Kinard, Lispole is the birthplace of Irish Republican revolutionary Thomas Ashe (Irish: Tomás Ághas).
Lispole is the birthplace of Paudie Fitzgerald, cyclist and businessman. Won the Rás Tailteann in 1956 and attempted to represent Ireland in the Melbourne Olympics the same year

See also
List of towns and villages in Ireland

References

External links
 Kerry County Council Lispole Plan
Statement of James Fitzgerald, OC Lispole Company, Irish Volunteers, 1913-1921, Bureau of Military History.

Towns and villages in County Kerry
Gaeltacht places in County Kerry